Chip Knapp (born 1964/1965) is an American football coach and former player who is currently the head coach for Dover High School. He previously coached for 30 seasons at Wesley College, the final three as head football coach before the program was shut down. He played quarterback in college for Cornell.

Playing career
Knapp played college football for Cornell under head coach Maxie Baughan from  1985–1986. He earned the starting quarterback position as a junior in 1985, but was sidelined for part of the season due to a knee injury. He played in six games the following year, but the "fine play of Marty Stallone" kept him off the field for most of the time.

Coaching career
After graduating in 1987 with a bachelor's degree in economics, Knapp was hired by Cornell as the freshmen quarterbacks coach. He left before the season started to join the Kansas Jayhawks as an offensive assistant. He spent the 1987 and 1988 seasons there. He left after a promised stipend from Kansas was not given to him. Taking advise from friend Roy O'Neil, Knapp joined Wesley College in Dover, Delaware, as a defensive assistant. Though he only expected to remain with the program for a year or two, Knapp would eventually spend 30 seasons at Wesley. He was promoted to offensive coordinator in his third year, a position he would retain until 2018. 

When longtime head coach Mike Drass died in 2018, Knapp was promoted to head coach. Wesley compiled a 7–4 record in his first year as head coach. They improved the following year, making the second round of the NCAA Division III playoffs with a 10–2 record. The 2020 season was cancelled, but a spring schedule was later released. His team went 2–1 in the spring schedule. The program was discontinued in 2021, following Knapp's third season. As an assistant coach and head coach, he helped players to 48 All-American honors, 99 All-Region honors and 122 All-Conference awards.

He accepted a position as head coach of Dover High School in May 2021.

Head coaching record

College

References

Further reading
 

1960s births
American football quarterbacks
Living people
Cornell Big Red football players
Cornell Big Red football coaches
Kansas Jayhawks football coaches
Wesley Wolverines football coaches